Joel Richard Stephan Feeney (born November 21, 1957) is a Canadian country, pop music singer, songwriter and record producer.

History
Joel Feeney commenced his recording career with the pop rock band The Front. Feeney was also a producer on albums by other Canadian country singers including Family Brown, and worked as a session musician before releasing his debut album Joel Feeney and the Western Front in 1991. The album included songs written by members of The Front.

Feeney's second album Life Is but a Dream was released in 1993 and was produced by Chris Farren. It received a positive review from the Ottawa Citizen which called it a "soft-spoken but intense set of songs".

His most successful hit came in 1995 with "What Kind of Man", which topped the Canadian RPM country singles charts. This song also came from Life Is but a Dream. He is also notable for co-writing LeAnn Rimes' 2005 hit "Nothin' 'Bout Love Makes Sense".

Discography

Albums

Singles

Guest singles

Music videos

Other albums

Finkleman's 45s The Doug Riley Sessions Live From The Montreal Bistro
This album was released by CBC audio in 2001

Finkleman's 45s The Doug Riley Sessions Live From The Montreal Bistro Vol. 2
This album was released by CBC audio in 2003

References

1957 births
Living people
Musicians from Ontario
Canadian country singer-songwriters
Canadian male singer-songwriters
MCA Records artists
People from Oakville, Ontario